The Parma climbing salamander (Bolitoglossa paraensis) is a species of salamander in the family Plethodontidae.
It is native to Brazil.

Its natural habitat includes lowland rain forests.
It is threatened by habitat loss.

References

Bolitoglossa
Amphibians of Brazil
Endemic fauna of Brazil
Amphibians described in 1930